Ashraf El-Kordy (born 15 January 1967) is an Egyptian basketball player. He competed in the men's tournament at the 1988 Summer Olympics.

References

External links
 

1967 births
Living people
Egyptian men's basketball players
1990 FIBA World Championship players
Olympic basketball players of Egypt
Basketball players at the 1988 Summer Olympics
Place of birth missing (living people)
1994 FIBA World Championship players